Beury Mountain Wildlife Management Area is located on  near Babcock State Park and New River Gorge National River in Fayette County, West Virginia.  Beury Mountain's sloping terrain is covered with mixed hardwoods and oak-hickory second growth woodlands overlooking New River Gorge. Camping is not allowed at Beury Mountain WMA, but is available at nearby Babcock State Park.

Expansion
The State has committed to purchase the land and reimburse the Conservancy over a period of three years. WVDNR has expressed interest in constructing a rifle range and improving habitat along upper Buffalo Creek in the tract.

In February 2010, The Nature Conservancy and WVDNR again announced plans for an expansion of Beury Mountain through a new land purchase. In this new agreement,  were purchased from Greenbrier Wood Products by The Nature Conservancy. WVDNR will take title control of the land as it reimburses The Nature Conservancy for the purchase price through 2012.

Directions
Beury Mountain WMA is immediately south of Babcock State Park. To reach the area from U.S. Route 60, turn south on WV Route 41 at Lookout, and turn onto Sewell Road (County Road 19/33) and follow  to the Beury Mountain WMA.  Alternatively, take West Virginia Route 41 to Chestnut Knob Road at Layland, and then follow Beury Mountain Road to access the newer tract.

Hunting
Hunting opportunities include deer, squirrel, and turkey.

See also
Animal conservation
List of West Virginia wildlife management areas

References

External links
West Virginia Hunting Regulations

Wildlife management areas of West Virginia
Protected areas of Fayette County, West Virginia